John Powers Middleton (born January 1, 1984) is an American film and television producer. He began his film career as an executive producer for Oldboy (2013) before executive producing the A&E television series, Bates Motel (2013), and co-producing The Lego Movie (2014). Middleton's production company, The Affleck/Middleton Project, produced the film Manchester by the Sea (2016), which was nominated for six Oscars, including Best Picture. The film won Oscars for Best Original Screenplay and Best Actor.

Early life
John Powers Middleton is from Philadelphia, Pennsylvania. He is the son of John S. Middleton, principal owner and general partner of the Philadelphia Phillies. Middleton attended The Haverford School and later enrolled at Duke University and The University of Pennsylvania prior to pursuing a career in film.

Career
John Powers Middleton began his career as an intern, assistant, and script supervisor for a number of companies and productions before partnering with Roy Lee under his Vertigo Entertainment banner in the fall of 2010. In 2012, Middleton created and launched The Alfonso Aguilar Show, a 2-hour, drive time, nationally syndicated show on Univision Radio, and the first nationally syndicated conservative, Spanish language talk show in history. In February 2013, Middleton and Lee entered a joint venture with Joe Drake and Nathan Kahane to launch Good Universe, an independent full-service film financing, production, and global sales company.

John Powers Middleton and Casey Affleck formed a production company, The Affleck/Middleton Project, in June 2014. While running the production company, Middleton continued to produce with Vertigo Entertainment, Good Universe, Univision Radio, Warner Brothers Entertainment, and Fox 21 Television Studios, the latter of which he left for Warner Bros. Television.

Through these partnerships Middleton produced: The Lego Movie (2014), the A&E show Bates Motel, a reboot of the classic horror film Poltergeist, the Liam Neeson/Ed Harris thriller Run All Night, and Spike Lee's Oldboy, among others. He also worked on Manchester by the Sea, which starred his producing partner, Casey Affleck. The film was named the second best movie of 2016 by Rolling Stone, and 2016 film of the year by the National Board of Review. Middleton was a co-producer on The Lego Batman Movie (2017) and The Lego Ninjago Movie (2017), and has also worked on the new Stephen King adaptation of It. In the future, he will produce The Stand, many Lego film sequels and the film adaptation of the video game Minecraft.  Middleton was an executive producer on The Disaster Artist (2017), which was nominated for two Golden Globe Awards, including the Best Musical or Comedy Motion Picture. The film won the Best Actor in a Musical or Comedy. The film was also nominated at the 2018 Oscars for Best Adapted Screenplay.

During the 2017 and 2018 award season, two of Middleton's five films received recognition,  including The Lego Batman Movie which received a total of 41 nominations and The Disaster Artist received a total of 44 nominations across multiple categories and ceremonies.

Political life
Middleton is active in Republican fundraising, political strategy, the youth movement, and media, with his first effort in creating and producing The Alfonso Aguilar Show. He served as national co-chair for a year, from age 25, of the Republican National Committee's Young Eagles program. In support of the Republican Party, Middleton has hosted a variety of events, including a 2015 fundraising event for the Jeb Bush candidacy for the Republican nomination in the 2016 United States presidential election.

Filmography

References

1984 births
Living people
Haverford School alumni
Businesspeople from Philadelphia
Pennsylvania Republicans
American film producers